Michael Altman (born August 21, 1975) is an American lightweight rower. He won a gold medal at the July 2008 World Rowing Championships in Ottensheim with the lightweight men's eight. At the August 2008 Summer Olympics, he came eleventh with the lightweight coxless four.

Altman received his undergraduate degree at the Walsh School of Foreign Service after graduating from Redwood High School.  He went on to earn his MBA at UCLA.

References

1975 births
Living people
American male rowers
World Rowing Championships medalists for the United States
Rowers at the 2008 Summer Olympics
Olympic rowers of the United States
Redwood High School (Larkspur, California) alumni
Walsh School of Foreign Service alumni
UCLA Anderson School of Management alumni